Surprise Bay is a rural locality in the local government area (LGA) of King Island in the north-west and west LGA region of Tasmania. The 2016 census recorded a population of nil for the state suburb of Surprise Bay.

History 
Surprise Bay is a confirmed locality.

Geography
The waters of the Southern Ocean form the south-western boundary, and those of Bass Strait the south-eastern.

Climate 
Surprise Bay has a temperate oceanic climate (Köppen: Cfb), bordering on a warm Mediterranean climate (Csb).

Road infrastructure 
An un-numbered route (South Road) provides access to the locality.

References

Towns in Tasmania
King Island (Tasmania)